Bishunpur Assembly constituency   is an assembly constituency in  the Indian state of Jharkhand.

Members of Assembly 
2005: Chandresh Oraon, Bharatiya Janata Party
2009: Chamra Linda, Rashtriya Kalyan Paksha
2014: Chamra Linda, Jharkhand Mukti Morcha
2019: Chamra Linda, Jharkhand Mukti Morcha

Election Results

2019

See also
List of constituencies of the Jharkhand Legislative Assembly

References

Assembly constituencies of Jharkhand